Chika Kodama (born 19 March 1970) is a Japanese softball player. She competed in the women's tournament at the 1996 Summer Olympics.

References

External links
 

1970 births
Living people
Japanese softball players
Olympic softball players of Japan
Softball players at the 1996 Summer Olympics
Sportspeople from Hyōgo Prefecture
Asian Games medalists in softball
Softball players at the 1994 Asian Games
Medalists at the 1994 Asian Games
Asian Games silver medalists for Japan